Three ships of the United States Navy have been named USS Vermont in honor of the 14th state.

 The first  was one of nine ships of the line authorized by Congress in 1816, but it was not launched until 1848, and only ever saw service as a receiving ship, from 1862 to 1901.
 The second  was a 
 The third  is a

See also
SS Green Mountain State (T-ACS-9), an auxiliary Keystone State-class crane ship launched in 1964 currently in ready reserve since 1992.

United States Navy ship names